Jinchang Jinchuan Airport  is an airport serving the city of Jinchang in Gansu Province, China.  The airport was built with an investment of 343 million yuan, and was opened on 29 August 2011.  It is the sixth civil airport in Gansu and the first to be built since 1982.

Facilities
The airport has a  runway, and a  terminal building.

Airlines and destinations

See also
List of airports in China
List of the busiest airports in China

References

2011 establishments in China
Airports established in 2011
Airports in Gansu